The foreign alliances of France have a long and complex history spanning more than a millennium. One traditional characteristic of the French diplomacy of alliances has been the "Alliance de revers" (i.e. "Rear alliance"), aiming at allying with countries situated on the opposite side or "in the back" of an adversary, in order to open a second front encircling the adversary and thus re-establish a balance of power. Another has been the alliance with local populations, against other European colonial powers.

Geographic position and strategy of France

Over the centuries, France has constantly been looking for Eastern allies, as a counterbalance to Continental enemies. Throughout French history, this was especially the case against Austria-Hungary, Spain or Prussia: the Abbasid–Carolingian alliance (against the Umayyad Caliphate and the Byzantine Empire), the Franco-Hungarian alliance and Franco-Ottoman alliance (against the Habsburg Empire), the Franco-American alliance (against Great Britain), the Franco-Russian Alliance (against Germany). In particular, since 1870 the desire to counter German power has been a major motivating force leading France to create Eastern alliances. Even soon after the Second World War, good relations between France and the Soviet Union were again seen by Charles de Gaulle as an "Alliance de revers" to counter Germany.

Autochthonous alliances

American continent

France also has a strong tradition of alliance with autochthonous populations in order to resist a powerful opponent. In the American continent, France was the first to identify that cooperation with local tribes would be strategically significant, before England also started to adopt this strategy. An important Franco-Indian alliance centered on the Great Lakes and the Illinois country took place during the French and Indian War (1754–1763).  The alliance involved French settlers on the one side, and the indigenous peoples such as the Abenaki, Ottawa, Menominee, Winnebago, Mississauga, Illinois, Sioux, Huron, Petun, and Potawatomi on the other.

The French easily mixed and inter-married with the Indians, which greatly facilitated exchanges and the development of such alliances. Through these alliances with the Indians, the French were able to maintain for over 150 years a strong position in the New World at the expense of the British, who had much more difficulties in making Indian allies.

India

In India, the French General Dupleix was allied to Murzapha Jung in the Deccan, and Chanda Sahib in the Carnatic Wars, in the conflict against Robert Clive. The French succeeded in the 1746 Battle of Madras, and the French and Indians fought together and vanquished Anwaruddin in 1749, but failed in the Battle of Arcot in 1751 and finally surrendered in 1752. The French again had a success at the capture of Fort St. David in 1758 under Lally, but were finally defeated at Masulipatam (1759) and Wandewash (1760).

In 1782, Louis XVI sealed an alliance with the Peshwa Madhu Rao Narayan. As a consequence Bussy moved his troops to Isle de France (now Mauritius) and later contributed to the French effort in India in 1783. Suffren became the ally of Hyder Ali in the Second Anglo-Mysore War against British rules in India, in 1782–1783, fighting the British fleet on the coasts of India and Ceylon. From February 1782 until June 1783 Suffren fought the English admiral Sir Edward Hughes and collaborated with the rulers of Mysore. Suffren fought in the Battle of Sadras on 17 February 1782, the Battle of Providien on 12 April near Trincomalee and the Battle of Negapatam (1782) on 6 July off Cuddalore, after which he seized upon the anchorage of Trincomalee, compelling the small British garrison to surrender. An army of 3,000 French soldiers collaborated with Hyder Ali to capture Cuddalore. Finally the Battle of Trincomalee took place near that port on 3 September. These battles can be seen as the last battles of the Franco-British conflict that encompassed the American War of Independence, and would cease with the signature of the Treaty of Versailles (1783) establishing peace and recognizing America independence.

Tactical alliances

Some French alliances were purely tactical and short term, especially during the period of the Napoleonic Wars. Napoleon Bonaparte had launched the French Invasion of Egypt in 1798 and fought against the Ottomans to establish a French presence in the Middle East, with the ultimate dream of linking with a Muslim enemy of the British in India, Tipu Sultan, in order to oust the British from the Indian subcontinent. After having failed a first time, Napoleon entered into a Franco-Ottoman alliance and a Franco-Persian alliance in order to create an overland access for his troops to India. Following the visit of the Persian Envoy Mirza Mohammed Reza-Qazvini to Napoleon, the Treaty of Finkenstein formalized the alliance on 4 May 1807, in which France supported Persia's claim to Georgia, promising to act so that Russia would surrender the territory. In exchange, Persia was to fight Great Britain, and to allow France to cross the Persian territory to reach India.

References

Further reading 
 Hamel, Catherine. La commémoration de l’alliance franco-russe : La création d’une culture matérielle populaire, 1890–1914 (French) (MA thesis, Concordia University, 2016) ; online

Alliances
 
Military history of France